Pitcairnia prolifera is a species of plant in the family Bromeliaceae. It is endemic to Ecuador.  Its natural habitat is subtropical or tropical dry forests. It is threatened by habitat loss.

References

prolifera
Endemic flora of Ecuador
Vulnerable plants
Taxonomy articles created by Polbot